Am I Happy, Singing (stylized as Am I Happy, Singing_) is the sixth studio album by American ambient musician, Ricky Eat Acid. The album was self-released in 2016 before being released officially on April 20, 2018. It was written and recorded in a couple of days during the summer of 2014, after the release of Three Love Songs and it was shelved in order to accommodate Ray's other releases scheduled for that year.

Track listing

Critical reception 

Madison Bloom, writing for Pitchfork gave the album a 7.9 out of 10 saying the album "requires absolute stillness. It’s too jarring to score mundane activities, and too interesting to be relegated to playlists like “Hanging Out and Relaxing” or “Wine & Dine.” “two_beautiful ways of moving_your_hands” may be fabricated with gorgeous strings, but their incomplete, looped phrases arouse an intense yearning for them to fully bloom. It is a sensation I can only liken to the blushing tension between a “good night” and a first kiss. The anticipation escalates when the audio cuts out for a full four seconds, an eternity in song time. As a listener, you are hanging on every note, or lack thereof."

References

External links 
 Am I Happy, Singing on Bandcamp
 

2018 albums
Ricky Eat Acid albums
Self-released albums